Tobruk is a 2008 film written and directed by Václav Marhoul and starring Jan Meduna and Petr Vanek. It is an adaptation of the classic 1895 American Civil War novel The Red Badge of Courage by Stephen Crane, but transfers the action to North Africa during World War II.

Plot

Jiří and Jan are two Czech soldiers, fighting alongside the Allied forces against the Italians during World War II in Tobruk, Libya. Jiří Pospichal, 18 years old, signs up as a volunteer in the Czechoslovak 11th Infantry Battalion. His naive ideas about heroism are rawly confronted with the hell of the African desert, complicated relationships in his unit and the ubiquitous threat of death. All this takes its cruel toll in the shape of his gradual loss of self-respect and courage.

Cast
Jan Meduna as Private Pospíchal
Petr Vanek as Private Lieberman
Robert Nebřenský as Corporal Kohák
Krystof Rímský as Private Kutina

Production
The film was co-financed by ČD Cargo, HBO Europe, JCDecaux, Letiště Praha, Respekt, RWE and the Czech Ministry of Defence. It was shot in Tunisia.

Reception

The film was nominated for eight Crystal Lions at the 2009 Czech Lion Ceremony. It won best cinematography (Vladimír Smutný), best score (Richard Horowitz and Sussan Deyhim) and best sound (Pavel Rejholec and Jakub Cech).

References

External links
Official website
 

2008 films
Films based on American novels
Films based on military novels
Films set in Libya
2000s Czech-language films
North African campaign films
Slovak war drama films
Slovak-language films
2000s war drama films
Czech war drama films
Siege films
Czech resistance to Nazi occupation in film
Czech Lion Awards winners (films)
2008 drama films
Czech World War II films